Lohengrin (Azione invisibile per solista, strumenti e voci) is an operatic monodrama by the Italian composer Salvatore Sciarrino. Premiered in 1982 in Milan the work was later revised by Sciarrino and the new version was premiered in on 9 September 1984 in Catanzaro. The opera, which is less than an hour long, is loosely based on Jules Laforgue's 1887 parody of Wagner's opera of the same name, published as part of his Moralites Legendaires.

Roles
Soprano
Tenor
Baritone
Bass
Male chorus
Speakers

Plot
The story of Sciarrino's Lohengrin is seen from the point of view of Elsa, a Vestal Virgin who is accused of fornication. Lohengrin marries Elsa, but on their wedding night, despite Elsa's attempts to seduce him, he refuses to consummate the marriage. Eventually one of the pillows changes into a swan and Lohengrin returns to the moon on its back. The opera ends with the revelation that Elsa is actually a patient in a psychiatric ward.

Recording
Sciarrino: Lohengrin – Gruppo Strumentale Musica d'Oggi 
 Conductor: Salvatore Sciarrino
 Principal singers: Daisy Lumini
 Release date: March 11, 2008
 Label: Stradivarius  (CD)
Sciarrino: Lohengrin – Ensemble Risognanze 
 Conductor: Tito Ceccherini
 Principal singers: Marianne Pousseur
 Release date: August 18, 2005
 Label: Collegno (CD)

References

External links

1984 operas
Arthurian operas
Operas by Salvatore Sciarrino
Italian-language operas
Operas